Jim Roscoe (born March 29, 1950) is an American politician and an independent former member of the Wyoming House of Representatives, most recently representing District 22 from January 8, 2019 until January 10, 2023.

Career
Roscoe has served as a general contractor for Roscoe Corporation since 1992. He previously served as a Democratic member of the Wyoming House of Representatives from 2009 until 2013.

Elections

2018
Roscoe challenged incumbent Republican Representative Marti Halverson in the general election, and defeated Halverson with 55.6% of the vote. Roscoe is the first elected Independent member of the Wyoming House of Representatives since 1982.

References

External links
Official page at the Wyoming Legislature
Profile from Ballotpedia

Living people
Members of the Wyoming House of Representatives
Wyoming Democrats
Wyoming Independents
People from Lingle, Wyoming
21st-century American politicians
1950 births